Anja Byrial Hansen (born  in Horsens, Midtjylland) is a former Danish team handball player and Olympic champion. She won a gold medal with the Danish national team at the 1996 Summer Olympics in Atlanta. She also won European Championship twice, in 1994 and 1996.

Married to football player Per Pedersen, Anja has four kids; Oliver, Nikoline, Victoria, and Tobias and now lives in Copenhagen.

References

1973 births
Living people
Danish female handball players
Olympic gold medalists for Denmark
Handball players at the 1996 Summer Olympics
Olympic medalists in handball
People from Horsens
Medalists at the 1996 Summer Olympics
Sportspeople from the Central Denmark Region